Nicholas Paget-Brown (born 1957) is an English Conservative politician who was leader of the Kensington and Chelsea London Borough Council. He was first elected as a councillor for Hans Town on 8 May 1986. He became leader of the council on 23 May 2013. On 30 June 2017, he announced that he would step down as leader due to the council's response to the Grenfell Tower fire, and was replaced as leader by Conservative Elizabeth Campbell on 19 July 2017.

Early life 
Paget-Brown was born in March 1957. He studied at the University of York. In 1983 the Bow Group published his "Unfinished Business Proposals for the Reform of the House of Lords", a 14-page pamphlet.

Career 
Paget-Brown worked for a small start-up company in the City providing an online research service for financial institutions, which was acquired by Reuters in 1985. He then became an international marketing manager for Reuters. In 1991 he left to join Knight Ridder setting up a London office for them. He has subsequently done consultancy work.

Cultural activities as a councillor 
Paget-Brown has been supportive of Opera Holland Park over a period of many years. In 2008 as RBKC cabinet member for leisure services he supported the decision to take the company's production of Tosca on tour to Richmond. In 2015 when Opera Holland Park was restructured as an independent charitable organisation,  in his capacity as a councillor Paget-Brown endorsed the appointment of Charles Mackay to chair the Opera Holland Park Trust.

He was a champion of the Cultural Placemaking initiative which was started as part of the Council's Arts and Culture Policy in 2009. The plan was to build on the work of Opera Holland Park and Leighton House Museum to develop a broader coherent strategy to encourage developers to consider the council's creative and artistic ambitions when working on a development project.

Grenfell Tower fire

Three years before the Grenfell Tower fire, in 2014, the Grenfell Action Group – a residents group in Grenfell Tower – wrote to Paget-Brown calling on him to "investigate the actions of the council's Planning Dept and the TMO" whom they accused of breaking the law by failing to consult the residents as regards the Grenfell Tower Improvement Works.
However, when Paget-Brown was subsequently interviewed as leader of the council following the fire of 14 June 2017 on Newsnight, he caused controversy with his remark that "many residents felt that we needed to get on with the installation of new hot water systems, new boilers and that trying to retrofit more would delay the building and that sprinklers aren't the answer."

On 18 June, the government relieved the borough council of responsibility for supporting the survivors, after a perceived inadequate response. On 21 June, the council's chief executive Nicholas Holgate resigned amid criticism over the borough's response to the fire. On 29 June, Paget-Brown issued instructions that the first full meeting of the Council following the fire be held in private, without the presence of local residents or the media, contrary to convention. Having previously resisted calls to resign, Paget-Brown announced his resignation the following day. He was replaced by Conservative Elizabeth Campbell on 19 July 2017.

Personal life 
Paget-Brown has lived in Chelsea since 1984.

References 

Living people
1957 births
People from Chelsea, London
Alumni of the University of York
Conservative Party (UK) councillors
Councillors in the Royal Borough of Kensington and Chelsea
Leaders of local authorities of England